Putu Phutunqu (Aymara putu vault, phutunqu hole, pit, crater, also spelled Putu Putuncu) is a  mountain in the Bolivian Andes. It is located in the Cochabamba Department, Carrasco Province, Pocona Municipality and in the Mizque Province, Alalay Municipality. Putu Phutunqu lies southeast of Inka Pirqa.

References 

Mountains of Cochabamba Department